Bob Emery may refer to:
Bob Emery (broadcaster) (1897–1982), children's show host known as "Big Brother Bob Emery"
Bob Emery (ice hockey) (born 1964), ice hockey coach